The Alaska Communications System (ACS), also known as the Washington-Alaska Military Cable and Telegraph System (WAMCATS), was a system of cables and telegraph lines authorized by the U.S. Congress in 1900 and constructed by the U.S. Army Signal Corps. The communications lines were to serve both military and civilian needs in the territory of Alaska. On May 15, 1936 WAMCATS was renamed the U.S. Army Alaska Communications System. The Alaska Communications System remained under the control of the Army Signal Corps until 1962 when it was taken over by the U.S. Air Force. The ACS handled the radioteletype, radio telephone, 500 kHz ship-to-shore frequencies, collected communications intelligence, and other services for more than half a century in Alaska.

The Army Signal Corps (which develops, tests, provides, and manages communications and information systems support for the command and control of all the U.S. armed forces) connected military posts with each other and with the rest of the continental United States. This system of thousands of miles of suspended landlines and submarine cable included the first successful long-distance radio operation in the world. The telegraph was also the first major contribution to Alaskan infrastructure provided by the U.S. federal government, marking the beginning of the government's central role in the development of Alaska.

At the start of the 20th century, when the United States was committing American troops to military engagements around the world, the Signal Corps in Alaska worked to make sure military communications could flow. An important message, such as General MacArthur's World War II demand for the surrender of the Japanese, was received, automatically recorded as printed text and parallel punched holes on paper tape, and could then be relayed on to other stations.

The ACS also provided a vital lifeline – sometimes quite literally – to the many remote and almost inaccessible communities across Alaska: it enabled the icebound city of Nome to alert the outside world about a diphtheria outbreak which led to the successful 1925 serum run to Nome.

History
At the beginning of the 20th century, Alaska was a cold and inhospitable place where travel, let alone news, took a month or more to happen. In 1870, Alaska had just recently been sold to America by the Russian Empire.  In the U.S. that year, the U.S. Army Signal Corps began to establish isolated forts (meteorological stations) throughout the Western territories. These stations were usually not much more than cold, lonely huts manned by a single telegraph operator or soldier.

In 1900 the Congress appropriated nearly a half a million dollars for the purpose of establishing a land and underwater communications system connecting the various military posts in Alaska with the rest of the United States.

The communications system was operated by signal soldiers assigned to the depot companies at the various forts around Alaska. WAMCATS soldiers reported directly to the Chief Signal Officer of the United States Army.

Wired telephone poles eventually were put in place in Alaska, however, they were not reliable. One of the problems was that the heavy snow and ice typical in Alaska would cause the telephone poles to fall over, breaking the connections. During the winter there might be six feet of frozen snow that could topple poles. Laying cable underwater would solve part of that problem, and would also help the military with ship to shore communications.

The first submarine telegraph cable laid by the United States Signal Corps was in the Philippines in 1899. Soon thereafter, underwater cable was first laid in Alaska in 1900, when the vessel CS Orizaba connected Unalakik to St. Michael and St. Michael to Safety Island, Cape Nome.

Between 1900 and 1905, Army soldiers of the 59th Signal Battalion (also known as the "Voice of the Arctic") constructed a telegraph line linking the U.S. Army posts across Alaska with each other, including a  wireless system crossing Norton Sound on the west coast of Alaska. In 1903 an underwater cable between Sitka, Alaska and Seattle, Washington was also laid, allowing rapid communication between Alaska and the lower continental U.S.

By 1918, the 1st Signal Service Company was activated at Valdez, Alaska and 2nd Signal Service Company at Fort Gibbon to operate WAMCATS in Alaska. The 2nd Signal Service Company was not formally inactivated until 1927.

The vessel CS Dellwood undertook the laying of a new submarine cable in 1924 between Seattle and Alaska with a post at Ketchikan.

From 1931 the Army Signal Corps did not own a cable ship and so the system deteriorated until the beginning of World War II in 1941.

The first submarine telephone cables were laid in 1956 with the Army cable ships Albert J. Myer and Basil O. Lenoir undertaking the work. The cable came ashore at around  intervals.

The ACS was transferred to the Air Force in July 1962. RCA purchased ACS for $31.5 million in 1970.

U.S. Army cable ships

CS Orizaba
CS Hooker
CS Romulus
CS Burnside
CS Liscum
CS Cyrus W. Field
CS Samuel Mills
CS Joseph Henry
CS Dellwood
CS Silverado
Col. William. A. Glassford
CS Basil O. Lenoir
CS Albert J. Myer

CS Ellery W. Niles

U.S. Navy cable ships

USS Thor

USS Yamacraw

Footnotes

See also
 Mount Billy Mitchell (Chugach Mountains)

References

External links
  Photos of WAMCATS stations
  General Information regarding the Territory of Alaska 1912

  From the Tropics to the Arctic
Communications in Alaska
History of telecommunications in the United States
Military communications of the United States
Military radio systems of the United States
World War II American electronics
Communications in Washington (state)
1900s establishments in the United States